This is a list of aircraft produced by Yakovlev, a Soviet/Russian aircraft manufacturer.

Aircraft

Early aircraft

 AVF-10 (1924 - glider)
 AVF-20 (1925 - glider)
 AVF-34 (1926 - glider)
 AIR-1/VVA-3/Ya-1 (1927 - biplane trainer)
 AIR-2/Ya-2 (1928 - biplane trainer, improved AIR-1)
 AIR-3/Ya-3 (1929 - general aviation monoplane developed from the AIR-2)
 AIR-4/Ya-4 (1930 - improved AIR-3)
 AIR-5 (1931 - cabin monoplane)
 AIR-6/VVA-5/Ya-6 (1930 - light utility aircraft)
 AIR-7/Ya-7 (1932 - high speed trainer/record-setting)
 AIR-8 (1934 - trainer version of AIR-3)
 AIR-9 (1935 - trainer/record-setting)
 AIR-10/Ya-10 (1934 - precursor of UT-2)
 AIR-11/LT-1 (1936 - three-seat touring aircraft)
 AIR-12 (1936 - long-range record setting aircraft)
 AIR-13 (1936 - long-range racing aircraft)
 AIR-14 (1936 - prototype for UT-1)
 AIR-15/UT-15 (1938 - racing aircraft)
 AIR-16/LT-2 (1936 - prototype 4-seat version of AIR-10)
 AIR-17/UT-3 (1937 - prototype 3-seat crew trainer)
 AIR-18 (1937 - single-seat racing aircraft based on the UT-1)
 AIR-19/Ya-19 (1939 - prototype light transport based on the UT-3)
 UT-1 (1936 - single-seat trainer)
 UT-2 "Mink" (1937 - 2-seat trainer)
 Ya-20 (1937 - prototype for UT-2)
 Ya-21 (1936 - prototype racing aircraft)
 Ya-21/UT-21 (1938 - prototype single-seat fighter-trainer based on the UT-1)
 Ya-22/I-29/BB-22 (1939 - multi role combat aircraft prototype)
 Ya-23/UT-23 (1938 - prototype reconnaissance trainer based on UT-2)
 Ya-23 (1939 - prototype for Yak-4)

Bombers

 Yak-2 (1940 - World War II bomber)
 Yak-4/BB-22 (1941 - World War II bomber, improved Yak-2)
 Yak-28 "Brewer" (1958 - multi-role bomber)
 Yak-28P "Firebar" (1961 - long-range interceptor version of the Yak-28)

Fighters

 Yak-1 (1940 - World War II fighter)
 Yak-3 (1943 - World War II fighter)
 Yak-7 "Mark" (1941 - World War II single-seat fighter)
 Yak-9 "Frank" (1942 - World War II fighter/bomber, improved Yak-7DI)
 Yak-15 "Feather" (1946 - first successful Soviet jet fighter, developed from Yak-3U)
 Yak-17 "Feather" (1947 - jet fighter, improved Yak-15)
 Yak-23 "Flora" (1948 - fighter, development of Yak-15/Yak-17)
 Yak-38 "Forger" (1975 - V/STOL shipborne fighter)

Trainers

 Yak-7 "Mark" (1941 - World War II 2-seat trainer)
 Yak-11 "Moose" (1946 - trainer, developed from Yak-3)
 Yak-17V/Yak-17UTI "Magnet" (1948 - trainer version of Yak-17)
 Yak-18 "Max" (1946 - tandem two-seat military primary trainer)
 Yak-18T (1967 - 4- or 5-seat civilian primary trainer)
 Yak-20 (1950 - trainer)
 Yak-21 (1947 - prototype trainer)
 Yak-28U "Maestro" (1962 - trainer version of the Yak-28)
 Yak-30 "Magnum" (1960 - trainer prototype, designation reused)
 Yak-32 "Mantis" (1960 - trainer, single-seat version of Yak-30)
 Yak-50 (1975 - aerobatic)
 Yak-52 (1976 - aerobatic and military primary trainer)
 Yak-54 (1994 - aerobatic, developed from the Yak-55M)
 Yak-55 (1981 - aerobatic)
 Yak-130 "Mitten" (1992 - lead-in fighter trainer / light combat aircraft)
 Yak-152 (2016 - military primary trainer)
 Yak-200 (1953 - multi-engined trainer)
 Yak-210 (1953 - multi-engined navigator trainer developed from the Yak-200)

Airliners, transport and utility aircraft

 Yak-6/NBB (1943 - military transport/night bomber)
 Yak-10 "Crow" (1945 - liaison, commuter transport)
 Yak-12 "Creek" (1946 - liaison, general purpose utility)
 Yak-14 "Mare" (1948 - military transport glider)
 Yak-18T (1967 - 4 seat aerobatic trainer/utility)
 Yak-40 "Codling" (1966 - commercial passenger)
 Yak-42 "Clobber" (1977 - commercial passenger, developed from Yak-40)
 Yak-58 (1993 - light utility)
 Yak-112 (1993 - light general purpose utility)

Reconnaissance

 Yakovlev R-12 (1940 - prototype photographic reconnaissance aircraft based on the Yak-2)
 Yak-25 "Flashlight" (1954 - interceptor)
 Yak-27 "Flashlight" and "Mangrove" (1958 - fighter/reconnaissance)
 Yakovlev Pchela (1990s - unmanned reconnaissance aircraft)

Helicopters

 Yak-24 "Horse" (1952 - transport helicopter)

Planned aircraft

 Irkut MC-21 (proposed short- and medium-range airliner)

Experimental

 VVP-6 (experimental VTOL transport and weapons platform)
 Yak-3/I-26U/I-30 (1941 - World War II fighter prototype)
 Yak-5/I-28 (1940 - World War II fighter-trainer prototype)
 Yak-8 "Crib" (1944 - prototype utility aircraft, improved Yak-6)
 Yak-13 (1945 - improved Yak-10, prototype only)
 Yak-16 "Cork" (1948 - light civilian transport)
 Yak-19 (1947 - prototype jet fighter)
 Yak-25 (1947 - fighter prototype, designation reused)
 Yak-26 "Flashlight" (1955 - tactical bomber, developed from Yak-25)
 Yak-30 (1948 - fighter prototype, development of Yak-25)
 Yak-33 (early 1960s - V/STOL fighter, bomber, reconnaissance aircraft project)
 Yak-36 "Freehand" (1963 - VTOL demonstration aircraft)
 Yak-43 (1983 - projected replacement for VTOL Yak-141 fighter)
 Yak-44 (1980s - carrier-capable airborne early warning)
 Yak-45 (1973 - failed air superiority fighter design)
 Yak-46 (1990s - failed push prop design developed from the Yak-42)
 Yak-48 (1998 - projected medium civilian transport)
 Yak-50 (1949 - fighter prototype, development of Yak-30, designation reused)
 Yak-53 (1982 - aerobatic trainer prototype, single-seat version of Yak-52)
 Yak-60 (late 1960s - tandem-rotor heavy-lift helicopter design)
 Yak-77 (1993 - projected medium twin-engine business and/or regional commuter airliner)
 Yak-100/Yak-22 (1948 - projected transport helicopter design, initially named as Yak-22)
 Yak-140 (1954 - experimental fighter aircraft; cancelled in favor of the MiG-21)
 Yak-141/Yak-41 "Freestyle" (1987 - prototype supersonic VTOL fighter, initially named as Yak-41)
 Yak-201 (Fifth-generation VTOL aircraft intended for the Russian Navy in the 1990s) 
 Yak-220 (projected transport aircraft based on the Yak-200)
 Yak-1000 (1951 - high-speed experimental aircraft)
 Yak-EG (1947 - experimental helicopter)

International aircraft projects

 Gulfstream G200 (withdrew in 1995)
 Hongdu Yakovlev CJ-7

References

Yakovlev
Yakovlev